A home appliance, also referred to as a domestic appliance, an electric appliance or a household appliance, is a machine which assists in household functions such as cooking, cleaning and food preservation.

Appliances are divided into three types: small appliances, major appliances (also known as white goods) and consumer electronics (brown goods).

Definition
Given a broad usage, the domestic application attached to home appliance is tied to the definition of appliance as "an instrument or device designed for a particular use or function". More specifically, Collins English Dictionary defines "home appliance" as: "devices or machines, usually electrical, that are in your home and which you use to do jobs such as cleaning or cooking". The broad usage, afforded to the definition, allows for nearly any device intended for domestic use to be a home appliance, including consumer electronics as well as stoves, refrigerators, toasters and air conditioners.

History 

While many appliances have existed for centuries, the self-contained electric or gas powered appliances are a uniquely American innovation that emerged in the twentieth century. The development of these appliances is tied to the disappearance of full-time domestic servants and the desire to reduce the time-consuming activities in pursuit of more recreational time. In the early 1900s, electric and gas appliances included washing machines, water heaters, refrigerators, kettles and sewing machines. The invention of Earl Richardson's small electric clothes iron in 1903 gave a small initial boost to the home appliance industry. In the Post–World War II economic expansion, the domestic use of dishwashers, and clothes dryers were part of a shift for convenience. Increasing discretionary income was reflected by a rise in miscellaneous home appliances.

In America during the 1980s, the industry shipped $1.5 billion worth of goods each year and employed over 14,000 workers, with revenues doubling between 1982 and 1990 to $3.3 billion. Throughout this period, companies merged and acquired one another to reduce research and production costs and eliminate competitors, resulting in antitrust legislation.

The United States Department of Energy reviews compliance with the National Appliance Energy Conservation Act of 1987, which required manufacturers to reduce the energy consumption of the appliances by 25% every five years.

In the 1990s, the appliance industry was very consolidated, with over 90% of the products being sold by just five companies. For example, in 1991, dishwasher manufacturing market share was split between General Electric with 40% market share, Whirlpool with 31%, Electrolux with 20%, Maytag with 7% and Thermador with just 2%.

Major appliances

Major appliances, also known as white goods, comprise major household appliances and may include: air conditioners, dishwashers, clothes dryers, drying cabinets, freezers, refrigerators, kitchen stoves, water heaters, washing machines, trash compactors, microwave ovens, and induction cookers.  White goods were typically painted or enameled white, and many of them still are.

Small appliances

Small appliances are typically small household electrical machines, also very useful and easily carried and installed.  Yet another category is used in the kitchen, including: juicers, electric mixers, meat grinders, coffee grinders, deep fryers, herb grinders, food processors, electric kettles, waffle irons, coffee makers, blenders, rice cookers, toasters and exhaust hoods.

Consumer electronics 

Consumer electronics or home electronics are electronic (analog or digital) equipment intended for everyday use, typically in private homes. Consumer electronics include devices used for entertainment, communications and recreation. In British English, they are often called brown goods by producers and sellers, to distinguish them from "white goods" which are meant for housekeeping tasks, such as washing machines and refrigerators, although nowadays, these could be considered brown goods, some of these being connected to the Internet. Some such appliances were traditionally finished with genuine or imitation wood, hence the name. This has become rare but the name has stuck, even for goods that are unlikely ever to have had a wooden case (e.g. camcorders). In the 2010s, this distinction is absent in large big box consumer electronics stores, which sell both entertainment, communication, and home office devices and kitchen appliances such as refrigerators. The highest selling consumer electronics products are compact discs. Examples are: home electronics, radio receivers, TV sets, VCRs, CD and DVD players, digital cameras, camcorders, still cameras, clocks, alarm clocks, computers, video game consoles, HiFi and home cinema, telephones and answering machines.

Life spans
A survey conducted in 2020 of more than thirteen thousand people in the UK revealed how long appliance owners had their appliances before needing to replace them due to a fault, deteriorating performance, or the age of the appliance.

Networking of home appliances

There is a trend of networking home appliances together, and combining their controls and key functions. For instance, energy distribution could be managed more evenly so that when a washing machine is on, an oven can go into a delayed start mode, or vice versa. Or, a washing machine and clothes dryer could share information about load characteristics (gentle/normal, light/full), and synchronize their finish times so the wet laundry does not have to wait before being put in the dryer.

Additionally, some manufacturers of home appliances are quickly beginning to place hardware that enables Internet connectivity in home appliances to allow for remote control, automation, communication with other home appliances, and more functionality enabling connected cooking. Internet-connected home appliances were especially prevalent during recent Consumer Electronics Show events.

Recycling

Appliance recycling consists of dismantling waste home appliances and scrapping their parts for reuse. The main types of appliances that are recycled are T.V.s, refrigerators, air conditioners, washing machines, and computers. It involves disassembly, removal of hazardous components and destruction of the equipment to recover materials, generally by shredding, sorting and grading.

See also

Appliance warranty
Domestic robots
Domestic technology
Electronics right to repair
Home automation
List of cooking appliances
List of home appliances
List of stoves
Rating (electrical)
Smart Personal Objects Technology
Universal Plug and Play

Notes

References

Further reading

 Kriske, Rob; Kriske, Mary (July/August 1984). "Home Appliance Repair". Mother Earth News. Accessed May 2015.

External links